Malton Museum is an archaeological museum based in Malton, North Yorkshire.

History
The museum first opened in 1935 in the Milton Rooms. By 1982 the collection had expanded and the museum relocated to the Old Town Hall, where it was run by volunteers. This building was leased at a nominal rate from the local council; the expiration of this lease in April 2012 forced the closure of the museum at this site due to the prohibitive cost of the commercial leasing rates that it faced.

In 2013 the museum reopened in two rooms in The Subscription Rooms. 

In 2015 the museum employed its first paid member of staff in over 85 years thanks to a successful grant of £87,775 from Arts Council England for the 'Vivat Fido!' project.

Collections
The core collection is formed from the results of the first excavations at the Roman fort at Malton (Derventio) in 1927–1930 by Philip Corder and John Kirk. 

The current museum collections consists of approximately 1,110 boxes of objects, of which 96% is archaeological in nature. Approximately 4% of the collection is viewable on display at any one time.

References

Malton, North Yorkshire
Archaeological museums in England
1935 establishments in England
Museums established in 1935
Museums of ancient Rome in the United Kingdom